

Gluepot is a locality in the Australian state of South Australia located about  north-east of the state capital of Adelaide and about  to the north  of the town of Waikerie.

The locality was established on 26 April 2013 in respect to “the long established local name.”  Its name is derived from the former pastoral lease of the same name.

The land use within Gluepot is concerned with the use of the former pastoral lease as a private protected area known as the Gluepot Reserve which has fully occupied its extent as of 1997.

The 2016 Australian census which was conducted in August 2016 reports that Gluepot shared  a population of three people with adjoining localities.

Gluepot is located within the federal Division of Grey, the state electoral district of Stuart, the Pastoral Unincorporated Area of South Australia and the state’s Murray and Mallee region.

Weather station
Gluepot has been the site of an official weather station since 1999.

See also
List of cities and towns in South Australia
Riverland Biosphere Reserve

References

Towns in South Australia
Places in the unincorporated areas of South Australia